Zane State College is a public community college in Zanesville and Cambridge, Ohio. It was established in 1969 as Muskingum Area Technical College. It offers over 40 associate degree programs and certificates, workshops, and occupational skills training. Zane State College shares its main campus with Ohio University – Zanesville.

History 
Originally called the Muskingum Area Technical Institute, the earliest recorded plans for the college date back to 1962, during a Zanesville chapter meeting of the League of Women Voters. A year later with federal funding through the Appalachian Act and the Vocational Education Act of 1963, the first construction began with the Richards Road complex.

In 1969, the campus was relocated to its current location on Newark Road. Three years later, the name was changed to Muskingum Area Technical College. In 2004, the name was changed to Zane State College.

References

External links

Educational institutions established in 1969
Buildings and structures in Zanesville, Ohio
Education in Muskingum County, Ohio
1969 establishments in Ohio
Community colleges in Ohio